Dreamland is the debut studio album by the Italian music group Black Box. It was released on May 8, 1990 through RCA Records, and was preceded in 1989 by the international hit single "Ride on Time". The album was certified Gold in both the United States and the United Kingdom. The album is mostly remembered today for the song "Ride on Time" and the ensuing lawsuits by Loleatta Holloway and Martha Wash over their lack of proper credit and payment for their vocal contributions to the album.

Background and artwork
When the album was originally released, the credits listed the band members as Daniele Davoli, Mirko Limoni and Valerio Semplici (as the producers, songwriters and musicians), as well as Katrin Quinol on vocals. "Ride on Time" had been released as a single prior to the album's release, and singer-songwriter Dan Hartman and singer Loleatta Holloway had threatened to sue Black Box, as well as label RCA Records, claiming that the song contained heavy sampling of an earlier recording by the two (the 1980 number-one dance club hit "Love Sensation"), although no credit had been given to them upon the release of the single. Subsequently, Hartman was given songwriting credit for this track, and Holloway was listed as the featured vocalist prior to the release of the album. However, American singer Martha Wash actually sang the lead vocals on six of the other eight tracks on the album, although she was not credited in any way. The songs sung by Wash are: "Everybody Everybody"; "I Don't Know Anybody Else"; "Open Your Eyes"; "Fantasy"; "Hold On"; and "Strike It Up". Many of these songs were released as singles and achieved significant success on radio airplay and dance charts across the world. Wash claimed in a lawsuit filed soon after the success of the album's release that she was paid a flat fee as a "session singer" to record demos of the tracks that would eventually appear on the album, but that those songs would be re-recorded with a different vocalist. She reached a settlement with RCA Records that led to her recording contract with the label, as well as an undisclosed monetary compensation. The legal action by Wash and Holloway spurred legislation in the United States making vocal credits mandatory on albums and music videos.

The artwork of Dreamland depicts Katrin Quinol displaying her toned legs and longing stare, while sporting a cropped jacket and mini skirt.

Promotional videos
Various music videos were produced for Dreamland:
"Ride On Time (Remix)" (original version)
"Ride On Time (Remix)" (Videodreams version)
"I Don't Know Anybody Else" (original version)
"I Don't Know Anybody Else" (US re-edit)
"Everybody Everybody" (original version)
"Everybody Everybody" (US version)
"Fantasy"
"Strike It Up" (DJ Lelewel Remix)

Montage videos were also made for "The Total Mix" and "Open Your Eyes".

Track listing

Footnotes

Personnel

Black Box
Daniele Davoli – DJ, scratching, keyboards, backing vocals
Mirko Limoni – keyboards
Valerio Semplici – guitar, drum programming

Vocalists
Martha Wash
Loleatta Holloway

Additional musicians
Roberto Fontalan – guitar
Sauro Malavasi – guitar
Rudy Trevisi – saxophone, soloist
Raimondo Violi – bass, guitar

Production
Arranged by Daniele Davoli, Mirko Limoni and Valerio Semplici
Produced by Black Box (credited as Groove Groove Melody)
Recorded, engineered and mixed by Daniele Davoli, Mirko Limoni and Valerio Semplici
Kate Garner – photography

Charts

Certifications

References

Black Box (band) albums
1990 debut albums
RCA Records albums